The Itumbiara Dam is an embankment dam on the Paranaíba River near Itumbiara in Goiás, Brazil. The dam serves an associated hydroelectric power plant with a  installed capacity. The power plant is the sixth largest in Brazil and has the largest installed capacity of Eletrobrás Furnas' power plants.

Background
Between 1963 and 1965, a consortium of U.S., Canadian and Brazilian engineering firms studied and selected sites in Brazil for dams that would assist in developing the region with electricity. Originally, the Itumbiara Dam was to have a shorter height which would accommodate two other dams upstream. A change in plans raised the height of the dam, increasing the reservoir, eliminating the need for the two dams upstream and doubling power production.

Construction
Construction on the dam and power plant began in November 1974 and the river was diverted by September 1, 1976. On October 1, 1979, the reservoir behind the dam began to fill and on September 30, 1979, the left embankment was complete while the right was on November 30 of that same year. The whole dam was completed in April 1980. Despite poor weather along with engineering and technical difficulties, the project was completed on time. 97% of the firms working on the project were Brazilian and 90% of the supplies provided for construction were from Brazil.  The dam and power plant was originally estimated to cost $439 million but ended over $716 million when construction was complete. Including the electrical transmission system, the whole project cost just over $1 billion. $125 million for construction was financed by the World Bank.

Itumbiara Hydroelectric Power Plant
On April 27, 1980, the first generator went online and the last on December 30, 1981 just two weeks after the power house was complete. In 1997, the controls for the plant were switched to remote operation in a central plant in Corumba, leaving the control room unmanned.

Specifications
In total, the spillway has a  discharge capacity.

See also

List of power stations in Brazil

References

Dams completed in 1980
Dams in Goiás
Earth-filled dams